Danila Igorevich Kozlov (born 18 June 1997) is a Russian football player. He plays for FC Volgar Astrakhan on loan from FC Torpedo Moscow.

Club career
He made his debut in the Russian Football National League for FC Volgar Astrakhan on 17 March 2018 in a game against FC Shinnik Yaroslavl.

On 1 June 2021, he returned to FC Volgar Astrakhan on loan for the 2021–22 season. On 15 June 2022, he returned to Volgar once again for another season-long loan.

References

External links
 Profile by Russian Football National League

1997 births
Footballers from Moscow
Living people
Russian footballers
Association football defenders
Association football midfielders
FC Sportakademklub Moscow players
FC Orenburg players
FC Avangard Kursk players
FC Volgar Astrakhan players
FC Torpedo Moscow players
Russian First League players
Russian Second League players